Allahverdiyev (masculine) or Allahverdiyeva (feminine) is an Azerbaijani surname. Notable people with the surname include:

Aladdin Allahverdiyev (born 1947), Azerbaijani scientist
Ayan Allahverdiyeva (born 2005), Azerbaijani chess player
Elnur Allahverdiyev (born 1983), Azerbaijani footballer
Jalal Allakhverdiyev (1929–2017), Azerbaijani mathematician
Mahaddin Allahverdiyev (born 1962), Soviet Azerbaijani sport wrestler
Museyib Allahverdiyev (1909–1979), Soviet Army officer
Rafael Allahverdiyev (1945–2009), Azerbaijani politician

Azerbaijani-language surnames